Gargždelė is a village located  south-east of Salantai in Kretinga district municipality, Lithuania. According to the 2011 census, it had 56 residents.

It is noted for the Orvidai Homestead, a museum, which features an environment created by Vilius Orvidas.

References

Villages in Klaipėda County